Taco Management LLC, doing business as Taco Bueno, is a U.S.-based, quick service restaurant chain specializing in Tex-Mex-style cuisine. The company is headquartered in Farmers Branch, Texas, in the Dallas–Fort Worth metropolitan area. Its first location opened in Abilene, Texas in 1967.  The food chain has locations in Arkansas, Oklahoma, and Texas.

History
Taco Bueno was founded in 1967 by Bill R. Waugh, an art graduate from Abilene Christian University. The first store was located in Abilene, Texas.

In 1981, British food manufacturer Unigate paid $32.5 million to acquire Taco Bueno.

In 1996, Taco Bueno was sold to Carl's Jr.'s franchisor CKE Restaurants.

In 2001, the private investment group Jacobson Partners purchased the chain for $72.5 million to help aid CKE Restaurants in a debt battle.

On August 10, 2005, Palladium Equity Partners announced the purchase of Taco Bueno from Jacobson Partners. At the same time, John Miller was appointed CEO of Taco Bueno. In 2011, Ed Lambert became CEO of Taco Bueno, LP., followed by Mike Roper in 2015.

In fall 2015, Taco Bueno announced its first delivery expansion collaboration with mobile app Tapingo.

In early December 2015, Taco Bueno was purchased by TPG Growth, a division of the Fort Worth private-equity firm TPG Capital.

On April 28, 2017, season eight, episode seven of the CBS show Undercover Boss, debuted with the CEO of Taco Bueno going into the field to several Taco Bueno locations.

As of April 2018, Mike Roper who had left in late 2017, was replaced as CEO by Omar Janjua, who subsequently filed for Chapter 11 bankruptcy on November 6, 2018, for reorganization and continued operation, and also agreed to be acquired by Dallas-based Sun Holdings, which already owned or controlled over 800 various other fast food franchise locations, for an undisclosed amount. An affiliate of Sun Holdings, Taco Supremo, assumed Taco Bueno's outstanding debt and supplied $10 million in working capital to reorganize and revitalize the business. On January 15, 2019, Taco Bueno emerged from Chapter 11 bankruptcy.

In mid-June 2020, amid the COVID-19 pandemic, the chain opened its first Houston-area location in Katy.

References in popular culture
 Taco Bueno has been referenced several times on the television show King of the Hill.  In the episode, "Kidney Boy and Hamster Girl: A Love Story," Bobby discovers a Taco Bueno in the cafeteria of the high school where he is pretending to be a student.
 Founder Bill Waugh also founded Casa Bonita, a chain with one location remaining in Lakewood, Colorado. It was featured on an episode of South Park. See Casa Bonita (South Park episode)

See also

List of Texas companies (T)

References

External links
Official website

Companies based in Irving, Texas
Economy of the Southwestern United States
Regional restaurant chains in the United States
Fast-food chains of the United States
Fast-food Mexican restaurants
Restaurants established in 1967
1967 establishments in Texas
TPG Capital companies
1981 mergers and acquisitions
1996 mergers and acquisitions
2001 mergers and acquisitions
2005 mergers and acquisitions
2015 mergers and acquisitions
Companies that filed for Chapter 11 bankruptcy in 2018
2019 mergers and acquisitions